Lonar is a town and municipal council in Buldhana district of Vidarbha region of the Indian state of Maharashtra. The town is the headquarter of Lonar taluka and is located near Mehkar.

It is a meteorite crater created in the Pleistocene Epoch. The crater contains salt water lake is 1.8 km in diameter and is about 137 m below the level of the crater rim. A small fresh water stream drains into the lake. Due to evaporite effects, the lake is mineral rich and salty and sodium and potassium salts are extracted from it.

Geography
Lonar is situated around 360 km from Nagpur, around 100 km from Buldhana, around 100 km from Akola, 550 km from Mumbai, around 160 km from Aurangabad and around 140 km southeast of the Ajanta Caves, about 4½ hours drive via Buldhana.

It has an average elevation of 563 m (1847 feet).

Demographics
As of the 2001 Indian census, Lonar had a population of 20,082. Males constitute 52% of the population and females 48%. Lonar has an average literacy rate of 66%, higher than the national average of 59.5%: male literacy is 74%, and female literacy is 58%. In Lonar, 16% of the population is under 6 years of age.

Lonar crater

The Lonar crater is the world's only salt water lake in basaltic rock, believed to have been caused by a meteorite hitting Earth around 52,000 years ago. It is surrounded by forests with a large variety of birds, particularly peacocks, owls, red-wattled lapwings and ducks.

Flora and fauna
Lonar has its own ecological system. As the sun sets, the entire lake appears differently. The lake water sweeps across the shore like sea water, and the birds, wolves, peacocks and other creatures start making their presence felt. It is a wonderful scene to watch the sun rising or setting below the lake walls. The lake has a remarkable presence of splinters of glass confirming the meteorite's impact, which caused the enormous temperature rise thereby turning the sand into glass.

Ambar lake
This lake was formed by a small meteor which might have been separated from the main meteor. Shags

Temples

Numerous temples surround the lake, around the rim of the crater and further down around the lake, most of which stand in ruins today, except for the temple of Daitya Sudan at the centre of the Lonar town, which was built in honour of Vishnu's victory over the giant Lonasur. It is a fine example of early Hindu architecture. Vishnumandir, Wagh Mahadev, Mora Mahadev, Munglyacha Mandir and Goddess Kamalaja Devia are the other temples found inside the crater.

Transport and tourism

The nearest train stations are Shegaon near Khamgaon and Malkapur near Bhusawal railway-junction, on the Mumbai-Bhusawal-Nagpur route of Central Railway of Indian Railways and is around 100 km from Lonar. Buses also run to Lonar from Nagpur, Akola, Buldhana, Malkapur, Jalna and Nanded.

If travelling from Nagpur, one must take a bus till Mehkar near Washim and then head to Lonar. From Mumbai or Pune, the most convenient route is to first reach Aurangabad via bus (Mumbai and Pune) or train/flight (from Mumbai only) and then take a state transport bus to Lonar. From Pune, air-conditioned and regular buses run every hour from the Shivajinagar bus stand to Aurangabad.

Maharashtra Tourism runs a resort just 50 meters from the lake. This property is modern, well maintained and cheap. There also are several low cost and simple accommodations called lodges available in the town.

The food available in Lonar has influence from both Khandesh and Marathwada cuisines. It is unique and simple but spicy.

References

Talukas in Maharashtra
Cities and towns in Buldhana district